Blood quantum laws or Indian blood laws are laws in the United States that define Native American status by fractions of Native American ancestry. These laws were enacted by the federal government and state governments as a way to establish legally defined racial population groups. By contrast, many tribes do not include blood quantum as part of their own enrollment criteria.

A person's blood quantum (BQ) is defined as the fraction of their ancestors, out of their total ancestors, who are documented as full-blood Native Americans. For instance, a person who has one parent who is a full-blood Native American and one who has no Native ancestry has a BQ of 1/2. Nations that use blood quantum often do so in combination with other criteria. For instance, the Omaha Tribe of Nebraska requires a BQ of 1/4 Native American and descent from a registered ancestor for enrollment, while the Cherokee Nation of Oklahoma has no BQ requirement, and only requires lineal descent from a documented Cherokee ancestor listed on the Dawes Rolls, a specific census roll that still upheld racist stereotypes and blood quantum theories, and that supersedes other older rolls. Others use a tiered system, with the Choctaw Nation of Oklahoma using lineal descent for general enrollment, but requiring a BQ of "at least one-fourth" for all tribal council candidates.

The Indian Removal Act and the Trail of Tears led to a major enumeration of Native Americans, and many controversies and misunderstandings about blood quantum that persist to this day. As they were being forcibly driven out of their ancestral homelands and subjected to genocide, many Natives understandably feared and distrusted the government and attempted to avoid enumeration. But the only way to do this was to completely flee the Indian community, during a time of widespread persecution. Indians who tried to refuse, if they were not already in a prison camp, had warrants issued for their arrests; they were forcibly rounded up and documented against their will. It is a modern misconception that this enumeration was equivalent to contemporary tribal enrollment, or in any way optional.

The concept of blood quantum was not widely applied by the United States government until the Indian Reorganization Act of 1934. At the time, the federal government required persons to have a certain BQ to be recognized as Native American, and thus eligible for financial and other benefits under treaties or sales of land.

Native American nations have continued to assert sovereignty and treaty rights, including their own criteria for tribal membership, which vary among them. In the early 21st century, some nations, such as the Wampanoag tightened their enrollment criteria and excluded persons who had previously been considered members. Challenges to such policies have been pursued by those excluded.

Origin of blood quantum law
In 1705 the Colony of Virginia adopted the "Indian Blood law" that limited civil rights of Native Americans and persons of one-half or more Native American ancestry. This also had the effect of regulating who would be classified as Native American. In the 19th and 20th centuries, the US government believed tribal members had to be defined, for the purposes of federal benefits or annuities paid under treaties resulting from land cessions. According to the Pocahontas Clause of the Racial Integrity Act of 1924, a white person in Virginia could have a maximum blood quantum of one-sixteenth Indian ancestry without losing his or her legal status as white.

Native American tribes did not formally use blood quantum law until the government introduced the Indian Reorganization Act of 1934, instead determining tribal status on the basis of kinship, lineage and family ties. Some tribes, such as the Navajo Nation, did not adopt the type of written constitution suggested in that law until the 1950s. Given intermarriage among tribes, particularly those that are closely related and have settled near each other, critics object to the federal requirement that individuals identify as belonging to only one tribe when defining blood quantum. They believe this reduces an individual's valid membership in more than one tribe, as well as costing some persons their qualification as Native American because of having ancestry from more than one tribe but not 1/4 or more from one tribe. Overall, the numbers of registered members of many Native American tribes have been reduced because of tribal laws that define and limit the definition of acceptable blood quantum.

The National Research Council noted in 1996, "The U.S. census decennial enumerations indicate a Native American population growth for the United States that has been nearly continuous since 1900 (except for an influenza epidemic in 1918 that caused serious losses), to 1.42 million by 1980 and to over 1.9 million by 1990." In the 2000 census, there were 2.5 million American Indians. Since 1960, people may self-identify their ancestry on the US Census. Indian activism and a rising interest in Native American history appear to have resulted in more individuals identifying as having Native American ancestry on the census.

Prior to colonization, individual tribes had established their own requirements for membership, including the practice of banishment for those who had committed unforgivable crimes. Some traditional communities still hold to these precontact standards. Tribes that follow lineal descent may require a Native American ancestor who is listed on a prior tribal rations-issue roll, such as the Dawes Rolls for the Five Civilized Tribes in Oklahoma, or a late 19th-century census. In some cases they may also require a certain percentage of Native American ancestry, and demonstrated residence with a tribe or commitment to the community. Few tribes allow members to claim ancestry in more than one tribe. The Little Traverse Bay Bands of Odawa Indians accept persons of 1/4 Native American ancestry, plus documented descent from an ancestor listed in specific records. In part, this recognizes that the Odawa people historically had a territory on both sides of what is now the border between the US and Canada.

Each federally recognized tribe has established its own criteria for membership. Given the new revenues that many tribes are realizing from gambling casinos and other economic development, or from settlement of 19th-century land claims, some have established more restrictive rules to limit membership.
Between 1904 and 1919, tribal members of mixed African and Native American ancestry were disenrolled from the Chitimacha tribe of Louisiana, and their descendants have since then been denied tribal membership.

In 2007 the Cherokee Nation voted in the majority to exclude as members those Cherokee Freedmen who had no documented ancestors on the Cherokee-by-blood list of the Dawes Rolls. However, the Cherokee Supreme Court ruled in 2005 that they were legitimate members of the tribe at that time. After the Civil War, the US required the Cherokee and other Native American tribes that had supported the Confederacy to make new treaties. They also required them to emancipate their slaves, and to give full tribal membership to those freedmen who wanted to stay in tribal territory. The Cherokee Freedmen often had intermarried and some had Cherokee ancestry at the time of the Dawes Rolls, qualifying as Cherokee by blood, but registrars typically classified them as Freedmen.

Similarly, in 2000, the Seminole Nation of Oklahoma attempted to exclude two bands of Seminole Freedmen from membership to avoid including them in settlement of land claims in Florida, where Seminole Freedmen had also owned land taken by the US government.

Since 1942, the Seminole have at times tried to exclude Black Seminoles from the tribe. The freedmen were listed separately on the Dawes Rolls and suffered segregation in Oklahoma. More recently, the Seminole refused to share with them the revenues of 20th-century US government settlements of land claims. The Center for Constitutional Rights has filed an amicus brief, taking up the legal case of the Black Seminoles and criticizing some officials of the Bureau of Indian Affairs for collaborating in this discrimination by supporting tribal autonomy in lawsuits. By treaty, after the American Civil War, the Seminole were required to emancipate slaves and provide Black Seminoles with all the rights of full-blood Indian members.

American Indian tribes located on reservations tend to have higher BQ requirements for membership than those located off reservation....[reference to table] [O]ver 85 percent of tribes requiring more than a one-quarter BQ for membership are reservation based, as compared with less than 64 percent of those having no minimum requirement. Tribes on reservations have seemingly been able to maintain exclusive membership by setting higher blood quanta, since the reservation location has generally served to isolate the tribe from non-Indians and intermarriage with them.

Issues related to blood quantum laws
Many Native Americans have become used to the idea of "blood quantum". The blood quantum laws have caused problems in Native American families whose members were inaccurately recorded as having differing full or partial descent from particular tribes.

At certain times, some state governments classified persons with African American and Native American admixture solely as African American, largely because of racial discrimination related to slavery history and the concept of the one drop rule. This was prevalent in the South after Reconstruction, when white-dominated legislatures imposed legal segregation, which classified the entire population only as white or colored (Native Americans, some of whom were of mixed race, were included in the latter designation). It related to the racial caste system of slavery before the American Civil War.

Some critics argue that blood quantum laws helped create racism among tribal members. The historian Tony Seybert contends that was why some members of the so-called Five Civilized tribes were slaveholders. The majority of slave owners were of mixed-European ancestry. Some believed they were of higher status than full-blood Indians and people of African ancestry. Other historians contend that the Cherokee and other tribes held slaves because it was in their economic interest and part of the general southeastern culture. Cherokee and other tribes had also traditionally taken captives in warfare to use as slaves, though their institution differed from what developed in the southern colonies.

Issues with DNA ancestry testing
No federally recognized tribe enrolls members solely based on DNA testing, as it generally cannot distinguish among tribes.  Some tribes may require DNA testing only to document that a child is related to particular parents. Many researchers have published articles that caution that genetic ancestry DNA testing has limitations and should not be depended on by individuals to answer all their questions about heritage.

Many African Americans believe they have some Native American ancestry. But, in the PBS series led by historian Henry Louis Gates Jr., called African American Lives, geneticists said DNA evidence shows that Native American ancestry is far less common than previously believed; of the group tested in the series, only two of the people showed likely Native ancestry. Gates summarized the data:
Only 5 percent of African Americans have at least one-eighth Native American ancestry (equivalent to one great-grandparent). On the other hand, nearly 78 percent of African Americans have at least one-eighth European ancestry (the equivalent to one great-grandparent), and nearly 20 percent have at least one-quarter European ancestry (the equivalent to one grandparent.)
In response, one critic asserted the percentage must be higher because there are so many family stories (the reasons for which Gates and, notably, Chris Rock explored in the documentary), but felt that many people didn't always talk about it because to acknowledge it would be to deny their African heritage.

Some critics thought the PBS series African American Lives did not sufficiently explain such limitations of DNA testing for assessment of heritage. In terms of persons searching for ethnic ancestry, they need to understand that Y-chromosome and mtDNA (mitochondrial DNA) testing looks only at "direct" line male and female ancestors, and thus can fail to pick up many other ancestors' heritage.  Newer DNA tests can survey all the DNA that can be inherited from either parent of an individual, but at a cost of precision. DNA tests that survey the full DNA strand focus on "single nucleotide polymorphisms" or SNPs, but SNPs might be found in Africans, Asians, and people from every other part of the world. Full survey DNA testing cannot accurately determine an individual's full ancestry. 
Though DNA testing for ancestry is limited more recent genetic testing research of 2015, have found that varied ancestries show different tendencies by region and sex of ancestors. These studies found that on average, African Americans have 73.2–82.1% West African, 16.7%–29% European, and 0.8–2% Native American genetic ancestry, with large variation between individuals.

A notable debate in 2019 over the validity of DNA testing for Native American ancestry arose over the controversies surrounding Elizabeth Warren's ancestry.

Issues with tribal rolls 
Basing citizenship off specific enrollment rolls, like the Dawes Roll (that were taken after more than 80 years after Removal, after the Civil War, and after tribal government restructuring), is what scholar Fay A. Yarbrough calls "dramatically different from older conceptions" of tribal identity based on clan relationships, "in which individuals could be fully," for example, "Cherokee without possessing any Cherokee ancestry." And that by the tribe later "developing a quantifiable definition of Cherokee identity based on ancestry," this "would dramatically affect the process of enrollment late in the nineteenth century and the modern procedure of obtaining membership in the Cherokee Nation, both of which require tracing and individuals’ lineage to a ‘Cherokee by blood.’" Thus, the Dawes Roll still upholds "by blood" language and theory of its time even though the tribe does not require blood quantum. Author Robert J. Conley has stated that if a tribe like the Cherokee Nation are "really serious about exercising its sovereignty and determining its membership," then it should not use the roll that "was put together by the U.S. government and then closed by the U.S. government," meaning that a tribal nation is still subject to the settler definitions of its members when other outside nations do not require rolls, ethnicity, race, or blood quantum for citizenship, but rather birth location and descendance.

Implementation
Many Native American tribes continue to employ blood quantum in current tribal laws to determine who is eligible for membership or citizenship in the tribe or Native American nation. These often require a minimum degree of blood relationship and often an ancestor listed in a specific tribal census from the late 19th century or early 20th century. The Eastern Band of Cherokee Indians of North Carolina, for example, require an ancestor listed in the 1924 Baker census and a minimum of 1/16 Cherokee blood inherited from their ancestor(s) on that roll. Meanwhile, the Cherokee Nation requires applicants to descend from an ancestor in the 1906 Dawes roll (direct lineal ancestry), but does not impose minimum blood quantum requirement. The United Keetoowah Band requires a minimum 1/4 blood quantum.

The Mashantucket Pequot tribe on the other hand, base their tribal membership on an individual proving descent, by recognized genealogical documentation from one or more members of the eleven families included on the 1900 US census of the tribe.

The Northern Ute Tribe require a 5/8 blood quantum, the highest requirement of any American tribe. The Miccosukee of Florida, the Mississippi Choctaw, and the St. Croix Chippewa of Wisconsin all require one-half "tribal blood quantum", also among the higher percentages.

At the other end of the scale, some tribes, such as the Kaw Nation, have no blood quantum requirement.

Many tribes, such as Alabama-Quassarte Tribal Town and the Wyandotte Nation, require an unspecified amount of Indian ancestry (known as "lineal descendancy") documented by descent from a recognized member. Others require a specified degree of Indian ancestry but an unspecified share of ancestry from the ancestral tribe or tribes from which the contemporary tribal entity is derived, such as the Grand Traverse Band of Ottawa and Chippewa Indians and the Poarch Band of Creek Indians. Many tribes today are confederations of different ethnic groups joined into a single political entity making the determination of blood quantum challenging.

Other tribes require a minimum blood degree only for tribal members born "off" (outside) the nominal reservation. This is a concept comparable to a combination of the legal principles of Jus soli and Jus sanguinis in the nationality laws of modern sovereign states.

The Red Lake Nation of Minnesota declared in 2019 that all original enrollees on the tribe's 1958 roll were to be "considered full-bloods", regardless of their actual blood quantum as recorded on the roll. Since the tribal blood requirement for membership was (and still is) 1/4, the implication of this "resetting" of the original tribal members' blood quantum is that the grandchild of a person on the 1958 roll who was recorded as 1/4 Chippewa is now eligible for tribal membership, thus effectively setting the requirement at 1/16.

Tribes requiring 5/8 degree blood quantum for membership
(equivalent to five great-grandparents)
Uniquely, the Northern Ute Tribe requires a 5/8 blood quantum.

Tribes requiring 1/2 degree blood quantum for membership
(equivalent to one parent)
Chippewa Cree, Montana
Kialegee Tribal Town
Miccosukee Tribe of Indians of Florida
Mississippi Band of Choctaw Indians, Mississippi
St. Croix Chippewa Indians of Wisconsin
Pueblo of Isleta, New Mexico
White Mountain Apache Tribe, Arizona
Yomba Shoshone Tribe, Nevada

Tribes requiring 1/4 degree blood quantum for membership
(equivalent to one grandparent)
 Absentee-Shawnee Tribe of Indians, Oklahoma
 Ak-Chin Indian Community, Arizona
 Blackfeet Tribe of the Blackfeet Indian Reservation of Montana
 Cheyenne and Arapaho Tribes, Oklahoma
 Colville Confederated Tribes, Washington
 Confederated Tribes and Bands of the Yakama Nation, Washington
 Confederated Tribes of the Chehalis Reservation, Washington
 Coushatta Tribe of Louisiana
 Ho-Chunk Nation of Wisconsin Wisconsin
 Hopi Tribe of Arizona
 Keweenaw Bay Indian Community, Michigan
 Kickapoo Traditional Tribe of Texas
 Kickapoo Tribe of Oklahoma, Oklahoma
 Kiowa Tribe of Oklahoma, Oklahoma
 Fort McDowell Yavapai Nation, Arizona
 Fort Peck Assiniboine and Sioux Tribes, Montana
 Lac du Flambeau Band of Lake Superior Chippewa, Wisconsin
 Menominee Nation of Wisconsin, Wisconsin
 Mohawk Tribe, New York and Ontario/Quebec, Canada
 Navajo Nation, Arizona, Utah and New Mexico
 Oneida Tribe of Indians, Wisconsin
 Pascua Yaqui Tribe, Arizona
Passamaquoddy Tribe, Maine
Penobscot Tribe, Maine
 Poarch Band of Creek Indians, Alabama
 Prairie Band Potawatomi Nation, Kansas
 Seminole Tribe of Florida, Florida
 Shoshone Tribe of the Wind River Reservation, Wyoming
 Standing Rock Sioux Tribe, North and South Dakota
 Turtle Mountain Band of Chippewa, North Dakota
 United Keetoowah Band of Cherokee Indians, Oklahoma
 Utu Utu Gwaitu Paiute Tribe, California
 Yavapai-Prescott Tribe, Arizona
 Zuni Pueblo (Ashiwi), New Mexico

Tribes requiring 1/8 degree blood quantum for membership
(equivalent to one great-grandparent)
Agua Caliente Band of Cahuilla Indians, California
Apache Tribe of Oklahoma
Comanche Nation, Oklahoma
Delaware Nation, Oklahoma
Fort Belknap Indian Reservation, Aaniiih and Nakoda, Montana
Fort Sill Apache Tribe of Oklahoma
Hooopa Valley Tribe of California
Karuk Tribe of California
Klamath Tribes, Oregon
Muckleshoot Indian Tribe of the Muckleshoot Reservation, Washington
Northwestern Band of Shoshoni Nation of Utah (Washakie)
Otoe-Missouria Tribe of Indians, Oklahoma
Pawnee Nation of Oklahoma
Ponca Nation, Oklahoma
Sac and Fox Nation, Oklahoma
Sac & Fox Nation of Missouri in Kansas and Nebraska
Squaxin Island Tribe of the Squaxin Island Reservation, Washington
Suquamish Indian Tribe of the Port Madison Reservation, Washington
Three Affiliated Tribes of the Fort Berthold Reservation
Upper Skagit Indian Tribe of Washington
Yurok Tribe of California
Wichita and Affiliated Tribes (Wichita, Keechi, Waco and Tawakonie)

Tribes requiring 1/16 degree blood quantum for membership
(equivalent to one great-great-grandparent)
Caddo Nation
Confederated Tribes of the Grand Ronde Community of Oregon
Confederated Tribes of Siletz Indians
Eastern Band of Cherokee Indians, North Carolina
Fort Independence Indian Community of Paiute Indians of the Fort Independence Reservation, California
Fort Sill Apache Tribe
Iowa Tribe of Oklahoma

Tribes determining membership by lineal descent
These tribes do not have a minimum blood quantum requirement, but members must be able to document descent from original enrollees of tribal rolls.

Alabama-Coushatta Tribe of Texas
Alabama-Quassarte Tribal Town
Aroostook Band of Micmac, Maine
Cherokee Nation
Chickasaw Nation
Choctaw Nation
Citizen Potawatomi Nation
Cowlitz Indian Tribe
Delaware Tribe of Indians
Eastern Shawnee Tribe
Kaw Nation
Mashantucket Pequot Tribe of Connecticut
Mashpee Wampanoag Tribe of Massachusetts
Miami Tribe of Oklahoma
Mohegan Tribe of Connecticut
Modoc Tribe
Muscogee Creek Nation
Narragansett Indian Tribe of Rhode Island
Osage Nation
Ottawa Tribe of Oklahoma
Penoboscot Nation
Peoria Tribe of Indians
Pokagon Band of Potawatomi Michigan
Quapaw Tribe of Oklahoma
Samish Indian Nation
Sault Ste. Marie Tribe of Chippewa Indians of Michigan
Seminole Nation
Seneca-Cayuga Tribe of Oklahoma
Shawnee Tribe
Shinnecock Indian Nation
Thlopthlocco Tribal Town
Tonkawa Tribe
Wyandotte Nation

Tribes determining membership by both blood quantum and lineal descent
These tribes require both a specified blood quantum and lineal descent from an individual on a designated tribal roll.
 Confederated Tribes of the Umatilla Indian Reservation – Since 1993, have required 1/4 descent from any federally recognized Native American tribe, plus being the biological child or grandchild of an already-enrolled member.
 Grand Traverse Band of Ottawa and Chippewa Indians
 Little Traverse Bay Bands of Odawa Indians
 Little River Band of Ottawa Indians
 Poarch Band of Creek Indians

Other examples 
The U.S Territory of American Samoa restricts the alienation of non-freehold land to any person who has less than one-half native blood. "'Native' means a full-blooded Samoan person of Tutuila, Manu’a, Aunu’u, or Swains Island."

Similar usage
In Australia, the racial laws inflicted on the Stolen Generations have been compared to blood quantum laws, as mixed-race Indigenous Australian children were removed from their families to biologically absorb them into the white population under the assumption that full-blooded individuals were doomed to extinction.

See also

Castizo, in colonial Hispano-America, a person of 3/4 White (usually Spanish) ancestry and 1/4 Native ancestry
Dawes Act (1887)
Dawes Rolls
Impact of Native American gaming
Indian Register – the list of First Nations Canadians who are eligible for treaty benefits
Kamehameha Schools Admission Policy, Hawaii
Lineage-bonded society
Multiracial Americans
Native American identity in the United States
Native American reservation politics
Native American self-determination
One-drop rule
Tribal disenrollment
Tribal sovereignty
Walter Plecker

References

External links
 A Legal History of Blood Quantum in Federal Indian Law to 1935
 The Origins, Current Status, and Future Prospects of Blood Quantum as the Definition of Membership in the Navajo Nation
 Indian by identity: a look inside tribal enrollment, by Alyssa Kelly
 Blood Quantum: A Relic Of Racism And Termination, by Jack Forbes
 Blood Quantum — Why It Matters, and Why It Shouldn't, by Christina Berry

African–Native American relations
Native American culture
Native American history
Native American law
Race legislation in the United States
History of racism in the United States